The United Football League Football Alliance Charity Cup was a Filipino association football competition. It was played on a knockout stage (single elimination). The only edition served as the last competition for the 2013–14 United Football League season which was participated by the top 6 clubs of UFL Division 1.

Background

On 21 June 2012, UFL officials announced that it will introduce a new tournament to its calendar around May of the 2013 United Football League season. Originally, the UFL Super Cup was supposed to feature 10 teams from the UFL Division 1 and the top six clubs from its second division. A maximum of five foreign players would be allowed for each club during the inaugural tournament, and this number would be reduced to four players the succeeding years.

On 22 April 2014, it was officially announced that the planned UFL Super Cup will commence after the 2013 UFL season, and will be held annually after the end of each league competition. As for its participants, the top six clubs of the first division will compete in this knockout tournament. UFL president Randy Roxas said that the Super Cup was supposed to include foreign teams competing against the league and cup champions. However, he explained that inviting foreign teams became too expensive. The league champion and runner-up will receive byes to the cup's semi-finals, while the other four clubs will compete in two-legged knockout games.

2014 edition

The 2014 United Football League FA Charity Cup is the first and only edition of the tournament. The competition ran from July 12 to 26, 2014.

Global defeated Kaya 3–1 on July 26, 2014 at Rizal Memorial Stadium to capture the first and only UFL FA Cup title.

Competition format
The top six clubs of the 2014 United Football League competed for the cup.

Qualification

Top six clubs of the recently concluded 2014 United Football League qualified in this tournament. 
 Global
 Kaya
 Loyola
 Stallion
 Green Archers United
 Pachanga Diliman

Results

All quarterfinal and semi-final matches will be played in two-legged contests, with scores carrying over from the first game into the second leg. Given that all matches will be held in one venue, there will be no away-goals rule. The quarterfinal round kicked off on July 12, 2014 at Rizal Memorial Stadium.

Quarter-finals

|}

Semi-finals

|}

Third place match

Final

References

External links
 

 
Cup
Defunct football competitions in the Philippines
2014 establishments in the Philippines
National association football league cups
2014 disestablishments in the Philippines
Charity Cup
Charity football matches